Death Sentence is a philosophical novel by Maurice Blanchot. First published in 1948, it is his second complete work of fiction.

1948 French novels
Novels by Maurice Blanchot
French philosophical novels